David Greig "Skippy" Browning Jr. (June 5, 1931 – March 13, 1956) was a diver from the United States and Olympic champion. He represented the US at the 1952 Summer Olympics in Helsinki, where he received a gold medal in springboard diving. After his Olympic victory in Helsinki, Browning shinnied up a flag pole to steal an Olympic flag and was arrested.

Browning married Corinne L. Couch on September 7, 1950. In January 1953 he graduated from the University of Texas at Austin with a degree in business administration. In June 1955 he received his wings as a pilot in the United States Navy at Pensacola, Florida. On March 13, 1956, he was on a training flight in a North American FJ Fury jet carrier fighter when the plane crashed near Rantoul, Kansas, killing Browning. At the time, he was scheduled to be reassigned to Los Angeles to begin training for the 1956 Summer Olympics.

Browning was inducted into the International Swimming Hall of Fame in Fort Lauderdale, Florida in 1975. His father was his coach and instructor.

See also
 List of members of the International Swimming Hall of Fame

References

External links

 

1931 births
1956 deaths
Accidental deaths in Kansas
American male divers
Aviators killed in aviation accidents or incidents in the United States
Divers at the 1952 Summer Olympics
Highland Park High School (University Park, Texas) alumni
Medalists at the 1952 Summer Olympics
Olympic gold medalists for the United States in diving
People from Boston
Texas Longhorns men's divers
United States Naval Aviators
Victims of aviation accidents or incidents in 1956
Military personnel from Massachusetts